Bremetennacum, or Bremetennacum Veteranorum, was a Roman fort on the site of the present day village of Ribchester in Lancashire, England. (Misspellings in ancient geographical texts include Bremetonnacum, Bremetenracum or Bresnetenacum.)  The site is a Scheduled Monument.

The site guarded a crossing-point of the River Ribble. The first known Roman activity was the building of a timber fort, believed to have been constructed during the campaigns of Petillius Cerialis around AD 72/3. This was replaced by a stone fort in the 2nd century. For most of its existence the fort was garrisoned by Sarmatian auxiliaries, first stationed in Britain by Marcus Aurelius in 175. Prior to that it is suggested that the fort was garrisoned by the Ala II Asturum from Spain, but there is some uncertainty about this. Pottery evidence indicates that the fort was occupied for most of the 4th century until the end of the Roman period.

History
The first fort was built in timber in AD 72/73 by Legio XX Valeria Victrix. The fort was renovated in the late 1st century AD and was rebuilt in stone in the early 2nd century. During the life of the fort, a village grew up around it. A fort remained at Ribchester until the 4th century AD and its remains can still be seen around the present village.

A report on Roman remains at Ribchester was published by Francis Haverfield in Roman Britain in 1914:

The most famous artifact discovered in Ribchester, and dating from the Roman period, is the elaborate cavalry helmet. The helmet was discovered, part of the Ribchester Hoard, in the summer of 1796 by the son of Joseph Walton, a clogmaker. The boy found the items buried in a hollow, about 10 feet below the surface, on some waste land by the side of a road leading to Ribchester Church, and near a river bed. In addition to the helmet, the hoard included a number of patera, pieces of a vase, a bust of Minerva, fragments of two basins, several plates and some other items that Townley thought had religious uses. The finds were thought to have survived so well because they were covered in sand.

Culture

Diet 
Evidence for diet was recovered during the excavations in the vicus. Fish include smelt, salmon, eel, grey mullet and plaice/flounder. Animal bones consisted of cattle, sheep/goat and pig. Several flavourings were found, including coriander and dill.

Religion 
Several altars were discovered from the Roman fort, including ones dedicated to the Matres and Moguns.

Death and burial 
Several funerary inscriptions have been recovered including one dedicated to a decurion.

Rediscovery of Roman Ribchester 

Several antiquarians recorded their visits to Ribchester, including John Leyland, William Camden, and William Stukeley. Excavations began in the nineteenth century, with those undertaken by Thomas May and Donald Atkinson recovering the outline of the fort. The granaries were excavated in 1908, including the discovery of a layer of charred cereal grain. The Manchester Classical Association excavated part of the Principia in 1913, reported by Haverfield in 1914. Private excavations were undertaken in 1967 of a bath house. Excavations were undertaken in 1980 in the vicus. Ribchester featured in series one of Time Team. Along with the archaeologists, the Ermine Street Guard were also present; they reenacted the construction of a turf rampart using authentic Roman tools. The University of Central Lancashire undertook excavations during the 2010s in the area of the north gate of the auxiliary Roman fort.

In 1993, the first episode of Time Team that was recorded excavated the back garden of 2 Church Street in which a sizeable section of the fort's remains are preserved.

Archaeological remains

Visible remains 

 Ribchester Roman Museum, opened in 1915.
 Roman bath house

See also
Ribchester Helmet
Scheduled monuments in Lancashire

References

Notes

Other sources

 Buxton, K. and Howard-Davis, C. (2000) Bremetenacum: excavations at Roman Ribchester 1980, 1989-1990, Lancaster imprints, no. 9, Lancaster University Archaeological Unit, 
 Haverfield, F. (1915) Roman Britain in 1914, British Academy supplemental papers III, Oxford University Press, (Online Text, Project Gutenberg)
 Smith, T. C. and Shortt, J (1890) The history of the parish of Ribchester, in the county of Lancaster, London: Bemrose & sons, 283p
Edwards, B.J.N. (2000) The Romans in Ribchester, Discovery and Excavation, Centre for North-West Regional Studies, University of Lancaster, 
Shotter, David (1997) "Romans and Britons in North-West England",  Centre for North-West Regional Studies, University of Lancaster, 



External links

Vindolanda Tablets mentioning Ribchester Vindolanda Tablets Online
Ribchester Museum
Bremetenacum Veteranorum, Roman Britain

Image links
The Ribchester Cavalry Helmet
The Ribchester Hoard

Roman fortifications in England
Buildings and structures in Ribble Valley
Tourist attractions in Ribble Valley
Scheduled monuments in Lancashire
Roman sites in Lancashire
Roman auxiliary forts in England